Yafford is a hamlet on the Isle of Wight. It is in the civil parish of Shorwell. It has a non-operational water mill, which was working until 1970 and is now a listed building. The mill was a grist mill, working to grind corn (wheat, oats, barley) to create animal feed; it did not have the machinery to produce fine flour for people. It has an overshot water wheel, powered by the flow of water from a millpond. The pond is fed by a stream from the nearby village of Shorwell, part of the Buddle Brook. The name Yafford derives from the Anglo-Saxon word "hæcc"  meaning a hatch or sluice and the word "ford"; probably referring to grating used to stop animals being carried away by the current in a river.

References

Hamlets on the Isle of Wight